Simon Christensen, better known by his stage name Psymun, is an American record producer based in Minnesota. He was a member of Thestand4rd alongside Allan Kingdom, Bobby Raps, and Corbin.

Early life and education 
Christensen graduated from Saint Paul Central High School. He worked at a restaurant from the age of 14 to 23.

Career 
In 2013, Psymun released a collaborative album with singer K.Raydio, titled LucidDreamingSkylines. His 2017 EP, Rainbow Party, was released on Ghostly International.

Discography

Studio albums
 Awfully Nice (2010) 
 Serious Sauce Vol. 3 (2013) 
 LucidDreamingSkylines (2013) 
 Thestand4rd (2014)

Compilation albums
 Tape (2018)

EPs
 Rik Strrling (2012)
 Turtle Tape (2013)
 Paws (2013)
 Heartsick (2013)
 Pink Label (2014)
 Rainbow Party (2017)

Productions
 Coss – "Let's Begin Part 2" from Sleepwalking (2011)
 Allan Kingdom – "Wavey" from Future Memoirs (2014)
 Chester Watson – "Dead Albatross", "Chinamen", and "Picbascassquiato" from Past Cloaks (2016)
 Greg Grease – "Migraine" from Down So Long (2017)
 Dizzy Fae – Free Form (2018)
 Swamp Dogg -–"I'm Coming with Lovin' on My Mind" and "$$$ Huntin'" from Love, Loss, and Auto-Tune (2018)
 Future & Juice Wrld – "Fine China" from Wrld on Drugs (2018)
 Young Thug & YSL Records – "Chanel (Go Get It)" from Slime Language (2018)
 Banks – "The Fall" from III (2019)
 Dizzy Fae – No GMO (2019)
 Dua Saleh – "Albany", "Warm Pants", "Survival", and "Kickflip" from Nūr (2019)
 Velvet Negroni – Neon Brown (2019)
 Poliça – "Tata" and "Forget Me Now" from When We Stay Alive (2020)
 Gunna – "Do Better" from Wunna (2020)
 Jean Dawson - "Poster Child" from Pixel Bath (2020)
 Santigold – "High Priestess" from Spirituals (2022)

References

External links
 
 

Living people
Year of birth missing (living people)
Musicians from Minnesota
American hip hop musicians
American hip hop record producers